Gjon Simoni, Albanian musicologist and composer, was born in Shkodër on 8 February 1936 into an Albanian family of long cultural tradition and died in Tirana on 2 July 1999.  He was active in his city's musical life very early.  In 1966 he graduated in composition and history of music from the Tirana State Conservatory.  In 1966-1969 he was head of the Music Section in Gjirokastër, in 1969-1980 editor of musical programs at the Albanian Radio-Television, in 1980 head of the Composition Chair at the Academy of Arts in Tirana, in 1993-1994 teacher of music at the School of Music in Karditsa (Greece), in 1996-1997 dean of the Faculty of Music at the Academy of the arts in Tirana, in 1997 teacher of orchestration at the same Academy.  He was holder of various prizes and titles.
His musical works are being played at various musical events in Albania and abroad.  He also dealt with problems of music in the Albanian media and at various conferences and seminars.

Selection of musical works

Chamber music
 Three pieces for clarinet quartets (1995)
 Duet for viola and bass viol (1995)
 Suite of Korca songs for string quartet (1996)

Orchestral music
 Suite for string orchestra on motifs from the opera Mrika of Prenk Jakova (1981)
 "Migjeniana" string suite (1984)
 Suite from "the Sons of the New Age" ballet (1985)
 Three motifs from "Migjenian" cycle (1986)
 "Seasons of Waves," concerto for orchestra (1988)
 "Little Symphony for strings" (1990)
 Choral and fugue for string orchestra (1994)
 Concerto for piano and orchestra in three times (1986)
 "Migjeniana," ballet (staged first posthumously at the National Theater of Opera and Ballet in 2007)
 Greek fantasia for piano and orchestra (1994)
 Suite for strings (1996)
 Requiem for Mother Teresa (1998)

Instrumental music
 Variations for flute and orchestra on a popular theme (1975)
 Romance for flute and orchestra (1976)
 Festive dance for piano and orchestra (1976)
 Concerto for violin and orchestra in three times (1988–1989)
 Quartet for fagotto (1999), played posthumously on 3 July 1999.

Vocal works
 "Blossom, flowers, blossom," song on a folk motif (1997)
 Songs on folk motifs of southern Albania (1997)
 Two songs on folk motifs (1997)
 "Flowered Doublet," song on folk motif (1993)
 "De Profundis," cantata in three times for soloist, choir and symphonic orchestra
 "Ave Maria" (1991)
 Three variations on folk motifs for soloist and orchestra
 "Stabat Mater" for soloist and a cappella choir (1995)
 "Snowflower," song on folk motif
 "It Was My Fate," song on folk motif

Film music
Children's films
 "Squirrel Helps Chum," animated cartoon (1979)
 "Shoeshine" (1979)
 "Bear Breaks New Land" (1979)
 "Bear Seeks Father" (1981)
 "Little Rabbit" (1982
 "Gent's Hours," animated cartoon (1986)
 "Newest of Cities" (1974)

Feature films
 "Long Year" (1987)
 "Return of Dead Army" (1989)
 "Boys and Girls" (1990)
 "Appassionata" (1984)
 "Teenagers" (1990)

During the 1986–1999 years he processed about 150 folk songs, orchestrated 300 songs, and made 50 arrangements of vocal and instrumental works of Albanian and world music.  Among others, he orchestrated composer Pjetër Gaci's operas "Our Earth" and "Through Mist."

Publications
 "Orchestration" for students of the Academy of the Arts
 Textbook for high schools
 "Symphony of a Life," a biography of Cardinal Mikel Koliqi, published posthumously, Napoli, Italy.

References

1936 births
1999 deaths
People from Shkodër
Albanian composers
Male composers
20th-century composers
20th-century male musicians